Heinz Klevenow (8 November 1908, Hildesheim–27 January 1975, Hamburg) was a German actor.

Selected filmography
 Love '47 (1949)
 Second Hand Destiny (1949)
 Klettermaxe (1952)
 The Bogeyman (1953)
 Confessions of Felix Krull (1957)
 The Crimson Circle (1960)
  (1961)
  (1961)

References

External links
 

1908 births
1975 deaths
German male film actors
German male television actors
People from Hildesheim
20th-century German male actors